Dzierżysław  is a village in the administrative district of Gmina Kietrz, within Głubczyce County, Opole Voivodeship, in southern Poland, close to the Czech border.

The village has a population of 615 as of 2007.

History
The name of the village comes from the Old Polish male name Dzierżysław.

During World War II, the Germans operated the E201 forced labour subcamp of the Stalag VIII-B/344 prisoner-of-war camp in the village.

References

Villages in Głubczyce County